The Freeport Area of Bataan (FAB), formerly Bataan Export Processing Zone (BEPZ) and Bataan Economic Zone (BEZ) from November 20, 1972 to June 30, 2010, is a special economic zone in Mariveles, Bataan, Philippines. It was envisioned by Congressman Pablo Roman, Sr., a representative from Bataan, who authored Republic Act 5490 designating the said location as the first free trade zone in the Philippines. It is also the second freeport zone in the province since June 30, 2010, after Subic Special Economic and Freeport Zone in Morong and Hermosa.

History

1972–2010: Bataan Export Processing Zone/Bataan Economic Zone era

1972–2000s: Creation and downhill
On November 20, 1972, the Bataan Export Processing Zone (BEPZ) became the first official economic zone in the Philippines through Republic Act 5490 of 1969 primarily authored by Congressman Pablo Roman of Bataan and Presidential Decree 66 (with the latter also creating Export Processing Zone Authority (EPZA)). The BEPZ was one of the most progressive communities in Luzon during its first decade of operation. The area attracted over one hundred multinational locators. However, in the 90s to 2000s BEPZ (now renamed as Bataan Economic Zone or BEZ after the enactment of Republic Act 7916 in February 1995) stagnated and declined after it was outcompeted by two newly formed freeport zones from the remnants of American bases in nearby Clark and Subic Bay. RA 7916 also led to the change from EPZA to Philippine Economic Zone Authority (PEZA). EPZA/PEZA operated and managed the zone until June 30, 2010.

2009–2010: Transition period and conversion from BEPZ/BEZ to FAB, and turnover of zone's operations and management from PEZA to AFAB
To put a halt to BEZ's decline and allow the zone to fulfill its original mandate to become a catalyst for progress and development in the region, Bataan 2nd District Congressman Albert S. Garcia authored a bill for the conversion of Bataan Economic Zone into a freeport. The Philippine Congress thereafter passed the Freeport Area of Bataan Act (Republic Act 9728), which was enacted into law on October 23, 2009.  This Act created the Freeport Area of Bataan (which will replace the Bataan Economic Zone (BEZ) on the last day of the administration of President Gloria Macapagal Arroyo and upon her successor Benigno Aquino III become President of the Philippines eight months later on June 30, 2010), a special economic zone and freeport with a dedicated governing authority, the Authority of the Freeport Area of Bataan (AFAB) which will take over the zone's operations and management from PEZA on the said date of June 2010.

From November to December 2009, BEZ held its last BEZ Trade Fair.

During the transition period from BEZ to FAB in 2010, the question "Are you ready for the FAB?" is printed on signboards posted in various parts of Bataan, referring to the future Freeport Area of Bataan (FAB) which will replace BEZ on June 30 of the said year.

President Gloria Macapagal Arroyo appointed Deogracias G.P. Custodio as the first AFAB chairman and administrator in March 2010.

On June 30, 2010, PEZA turned over the zone's operations and management to AFAB which officially started the management and operations of the latter over the zone, and resulted in the conversion of the zone from BEZ into FAB, abolishment of BEZ and the creation of the second freeport zone in the province after Subic Freeport in Morong and Hermosa pursuant to Section 28 of RA 9728, with Deogracias G.P. Custodio became the first AFAB chairman and administrator after being appointed three months earlier.

2010–present: Freeport Area of Bataan era
The BEZ/BEPZ/PEZA names and its logo, and all references to it continued to be used such as on signages even after BEZ/BEPZ was converted into FAB and operations and management of the zone was turned over from PEZA to AFAB on June 30, 2010 although starting from the said date of June 2010, the process of phasing out the usage of PEZA/BEPZ/BEZ names, logo, and references were done until all signs, traces, and remnants of them were removed in 2011. The BEZ sticker is still effective until FAB started to issue its own sticker in 2011 which succeeded the former.

FAB initially had 39 enterprises and 12,777 workers by the time of conversion of the zone from BEZ to FAB and turnover of the zone's operations and management from PEZA to AFAB on June 30, 2010 which inherited from its predecessor Bataan Economic Zone (BEZ).

From November 8 to December 23, 2010, FAB held its first FAB Fair named "FAB Fair '10: FAB on the Rise!". FAB Fair succeeded BEZ Trade Fair as a result of the conversion from BEZ to FAB.

In 2012, the FAB registered the highest increase in employment generation among Investment Promotion Agencies (IPAs) after posting the highest growth rate, with PhP 390.6 million worth of investments, expanding by more than four times the PhP 86.0 million approved in 2011.

On August 30, 2019, President Rodrigo Duterte signed Republic Act 11453, amending the provisions of RA 9728, and further strengthening the powers and functions of AFAB, enabling the freeport to expant its operation anywhere within the province of Bataan.

Currently, FAB is the third largest freeport zone in the country based in the number of investors and employment created, behind Clark Freeport and Subic Freeport. The value of exported products reached more than US$913-million for the year 2022 from the 44 manufacturers operating in the freeport,  employing roughly 40,000 personnels. The various products produced are leather goods, electronic components, textile, sports and outdoor apparels, formed rubber and plastic products, medical personal protective equipment, fabricated metals, animal feeds, marine vessels, refined petroleum, petrochemicals and optical lenses. The tennis balls used in the Wimbledon Grand Slam are made in FAB.

FAB is also an emerging hub for fintech and blockchain businesses in the Philippines hosting a number of these companies.

Logo

When Freeport Area of Bataan was known as Bataan Export Processing Zone (BEPZ) and Bataan Economic Zone (BEZ) from November 20, 1972 to June 30, 2010, it used the logo of Philippine Economic Zone Authority (PEZA). This logo was used from the creation of BEPZ on November 20, 1972 until 2011. Despite that PEZA already turned over the zone's operations and management to Authority of the Freeport Area of Bataan (AFAB), BEZ was converted to FAB, and the abolishment of BEZ on June 30, 2010, the BEPZ/BEZ/PEZA names and logo and all references to it continued to be used such as on signages until they were completely removed in 2011. This logo was also used on its stickers to enter the zone's premises until FAB started to issue its own sticker in 2011 which succeeded the BEZ sticker.

The first logo as Freeport Area of Bataan, used from the conversion of the zone from BEZ to FAB and turnover of the zone's operations and management from PEZA to AFAB on June 30, 2010 to 2011, featured a phoenix symbol and AFAB text on a red rectangle. The phoenix symbolizes the change or transition from BEPZ/BEZ to FAB which happened on June 30, 2010 - a rebirth of sorts. This logo was only used for one year.

The second and current logo of FAB, used since April 2011, features the FAB in blue text with red and blue swirl or spiral on the upper-right of the text, and the text "Freeport Area of Bataan" below. The swirl or spiral of the logo symbolizes growth, swirl's interlocking parts represents trade and partnership, and red and blue are reminiscent of national pride, with red exudes determination, passion and strength, and blue depicts stability and depth. This logo is currently used on the freeport zone's administration building since late 2011.

Location

FAB is located in a cove at the southern tip of the Bataan Peninsula and is about 172.3 kilometers from Manila. The freeport zone is accessible from the Philippines' capital city Manila via Andres Bonifacio Avenue from Manila to Balintawak in Quezon City, North Luzon Expressway (NLEx) from Balintawak, Quezon City to San Fernando, Pampanga, Jose Abad Santos Avenue (Olongapo-Gapan Road) from San Fernando to Dinalupihan, Bataan, and Roman Superhighway from Dinalupihan to Mariveles. The primary host town Mariveles has a total land area of 153.9 km2 or  representing 12% of the total land area of Bataan. Of this, about 35% consist of the pastureland, 4.6% of forestland, 3.8% agricultural lands and the remaining 6% for residential and industrial use. It is home to a Filipino community speaking a Languages of the Philippines called Mariveleño. According to the 2020 census, it has a population of 149, 879 people.

Agricultural resources include rice, mangoes, legumes, vegetables and coffee. It also has aquatic resources like round scads, grouper, mussel, and abalone; mineral deposits of granite and basalt and forest products like vines and bamboo.

Scope
The freeport area originally covers 2 barangays of Mariveles namely Barangays Maligaya (Pizarro) and Malaya (Quadro), however since August 2019 after the enactment of R.A. No. 11453, FAB is given the power to include the remaining areas of Mariveles and further expand to any area inside Bataan excluding the Hermosa and Morong portions of Subic Special Economic and Freeport Zone, another freeport zone located within the province and under the Subic Bay Metropolitan Authority (SBMA), as defined by R.A. No. 7227. Before an area can be declared a freeport expansion zone, it'll be subjected to the concurrence of affected local government units and the approval of appropriate national government agencies, government owned and controlled corporations (GOCC) and instrumentalities, and the AFAB Board.

Currently there are already 17 approved expansion areas. Their declared economic activities include light and medium industrial, power generation, port services, agri-industrial, commercial, tourism, MICE activities, and BPO/IT in eight (8) different municipalities and the capital city of the province. Of which, ten (10) are now in development, and seven (7) are already operating. Six (6) of these expansion areas are located in Mariveles, while eleven are scattered in the towns of Bagac, Dinalupihan, Hermosa, Orani, Abucay, Pilar, and Limay, and in the City of Balanga.

See also
Clark Freeport and Special Economic Zone
Subic Special Economic and Freeport Zone

References

External links
BEPZA Bataan General Information
Philippine Standard Geographic Code
2000 Philippine Census Information

Politics of Bataan
Foreign trade of the Philippines
Industrial parks in the Philippines
Buildings and structures in Bataan
Special economic zones

tl:BEPZA, Bataan